Gonzalo Grau y la Clave Secreta are a jazz band which originated in Boston, Massachusetts, United States.

History
Gonzalo Grau was born in Caracas, Venezuela, the son of Alberto Grau and Isabel Palacios. He studied at the Berklee College of Music in Boston. He produced Osvaldo Golijov's La Pasión según San Marcos which won its nominated category at Germany's Echo Klassik Awards in 2010, and arranged several tracks on tenor Rolando Villazón's ¡México! which won an Echo Klassik award the following year. In 2011 Grau won the Young Euro Classic Composer Award, given in recognition of the best world premiere or German premiere at the festival, for his work Aqua.

Grau formed La Clave Secreta in Boston with musicians of various nationalities. The group have been described as mixing "Afro-Cuban styles like salsa and timba with subtle hints of funk and R&B". The band's album Frutero Moderno was nominated for Best Tropical Latin Album at the 51st Annual Grammy Awards in 2009. In addition to La Clave Secreta, Grau also fronts another band, Plural, which is based in Caracas.

References

1998 establishments in Massachusetts
Musical groups established in 1998
Musical groups from Boston